Bowdon is a village in the Metropolitan Borough of Trafford, Greater Manchester, England.  It contains 33 listed buildings that are recorded in the National Heritage List for England.  Of these, two are listed at Grade II*, the middle grade, and the others are at Grade II, the lowest grade.  Bowdon originated as a village in a rural environment, and grew during the 19th century as a commuter town for Manchester, attracting wealthy merchants who built substantial houses.  The oldest listed buildings are farmhouses and farm buildings, and houses and cottages clustered around the church, and the later ones include some of the larger houses.  The other listed buildings include the church and associated structures, a public house, a drinking fountain, and a war memorial.


Key

Buildings

References

Citations

Sources

Lists of listed buildings in Greater Manchester